The Pac-12 Conference Softball Coach of the Year is a college softball award given to the Pac-12 Conference's most outstanding coach. The award has been given annually since 1987. The conference was known as the Pacific-10 before becoming the Pac-12 in 2011. Mike Candrea has won the award a record eleven times.

Winners

Winners by school

References

Awards established in 1987
Coach
NCAA Division I softball conference coaches of the year